South Orange County Community College District (SOCCCD) is a public community college district in Orange County, California. It was founded in 1967 and has three separate campuses: Saddleback College in Mission Viejo, California, Irvine Valley College in Irvine, California and the Advanced Technology & Education Park in Tustin, California. The district is governed by a seven-member elected board of trustees and a chancellor. Located north of San Diego County and stretching from the Santa Ana Mountains to the Pacific Ocean, the district's  service area encompasses the southern half of Orange County.

Board of trustees
The SOCCCD Board of Trustees is composed of seven trustees elected by the registered voters of the communities of south Orange County and one student member elected by the student body of Irvine Valley College and Saddleback College. Trustees, with the exception of the student member, are elected to four-year terms commencing December of the year elected. As terms are staggered, elections are held every two years in connection with the general election. The seven locally elected trustees must reside in one of seven districts.

References

External links
 Official website

California Community Colleges
Universities and colleges in Orange County, California
1967 establishments in California
School districts established in 1967